Kalia is the Tongan adaptation of a drua or double-hulled Polynesian sailing watercraft.

References

Sailboat types
Tongan culture